Monique Hennagan (born May 26, 1976, in Columbia, South Carolina) is an American athlete who mainly competes in the 400 metres. She won her first relay medal at the 1999 World Indoor Championships and her second in 2003.

Monique Hennagan graduated from the University of North Carolina at Chapel Hill with a double major in Psychology and African American Studies. As a collegiate athlete, Hennagan was World Juniors gold  relay and silver 400m medalist in 1994. At UNC, she was All-American in the 400m and  relay. Additionally, 2X NCAA Track and Field Champion both in the 400m indoor and the 800m outdoor in 1996. She was an 8X ACC individual champion and won 400m for four consecutive years.

As a post collegiate 1998–2009, Monique traveled the world competing as a Professional Track and Field Athlete. Hennagan was the silver medal recipient for women's  relay at the 1998 Goodwill Games. At the 2001 Goodwill Games, Monique Hennagan won gold for the women's  relay. In 2002 and 2003, Hennagan was a 2X USA Indoor 400m Champion. In 2000 and 2004, Hennagan won Sydney's and Athens’ Olympics, respectively, for the women’s  relay; also, 4th place Champion in 400m at the 2004 Olympic Trials. Hennagan earned 2nd place finisher at IAAF World Athletics Finals 400m. She received a gold medal for the women’s  relay at the 2007 World Championship in Athletics. Monique Hennagan has been ranked “Top 8 in the World” three times, including 3rd place in the world, personal highest.

In 2014, Monique Hennagan was inducted in South Carolina's Athletic Hall of Fame. Today, Monique travels the United States working for American Federation of State County and Municipal Employees as an advocate for worker's rights. She will also serve as Treasurer, for Divine Appointment Transformation House; a non-profit organization that Monique's mother, Mary Hennagan, is currently developing. Additionally, Monique Hennagan is an independent consultant with Paparazzi accessories, www.myfunmyclassy.com.

Personal Bests
 100 metres: 11.26 seconds (2005)
 200 metres: 22.87 seconds (2005)
300 metres: 36.52 seconds (2001)
 400 metres: 49.56 seconds (2004)
800 metres: 2:02.50 seconds (1996)
 relay: 3:19.01 seconds (2004)

Achievements

References

 
 Monique Hennagan's USATF bio



1976 births
Living people
Athletes (track and field) at the 2000 Summer Olympics
Athletes (track and field) at the 2004 Summer Olympics
American female sprinters
Sportspeople from Columbia, South Carolina
Track and field athletes from South Carolina
North Carolina Tar Heels women's track and field athletes
Olympic gold medalists for the United States in track and field
Medalists at the 2004 Summer Olympics
Medalists at the 2000 Summer Olympics
Goodwill Games medalists in athletics
World Athletics Indoor Championships medalists
World Athletics Championships winners
Competitors at the 1998 Goodwill Games
Competitors at the 2001 Goodwill Games
Goodwill Games gold medalists in athletics
Olympic female sprinters